

National team

UEFA Futsal Champions League

Super League
31st Russian futsal championship 2020/2021

Regular season

Play Offs

National Cup

Knockout stage

Top League

Eastern Conference regular season

Western Conference regular season

Playoffs

Women's League

Eastern Conference

Western Conference

Women's National Cup

References

External links
Results at UEFA.com

Russia
Seasons in Russian futsal
futsal